Marc Hensel (born 17 April 1986) is a German former professional footballer who played as a midfielder or forward. He was forced to retire due to injury problems.

References

External links

1986 births
Living people
Footballers from Dresden
German footballers
Association football midfielders
Association football forwards
Dynamo Dresden players
Dynamo Dresden II players
FC Energie Cottbus II players
FC Erzgebirge Aue players
Chemnitzer FC players
2. Bundesliga players
3. Liga players
Regionalliga players
German football managers
FC Erzgebirge Aue managers
2. Bundesliga managers